Gnomidolon elegantulum is a species of beetle in the family Cerambycidae. It was described by Lameere in 1885.

References

Gnomidolon
Beetles described in 1885
Taxa named by Auguste Lameere